The Einar Nielsen Fieldhouse was a multi-purpose arena in the western United States, located in Salt Lake City, Utah.  Opened  in 1939 on the University of Utah campus, it was the home venue of Utes basketball for thirty years, and was formally dedicated on the night of Tuesday, 

The fieldhouse hosted a pair of first round games of the 23-team NCAA tournament  and high school basketball state tournaments. It was succeeded as the primary indoor venue on campus by the Jon M. Huntsman Center, which opened in late 1969 as the Special Events Center.

The building served as a fitness and recreation center for students and staff at the university for many years, but now acts as a studio for students in the "pre-programs" for Multidisciplinary Design and Architecture.

References

External links
University of Utah Historic Buildings - Einar Nielsen Fieldhouse

Utah Utes basketball venues
Basketball venues in Salt Lake City
Defunct college basketball venues in the United States
Indoor arenas in Salt Lake City
Sports venues in Salt Lake City
Event venues established in 1939
Sports venues completed in 1939
1939 establishments in Utah